Trigonopterus chewbacca is a species of flightless weevil in the genus Trigonopterus from Papua New Guinea.

Etymology
The specific name is derived from a parallel being drawn between the dense scales on the head and legs of this species, and the Star Wars character Chewbacca.

References

chewbacca
Beetles described in 2016
Beetles of Papua New Guinea